Parkal is a town in Hanumakonda district of the Indian state of Telangana.

Government and politics 
Parkal  is a Assembly Constituency of Telangana Legislative Assembly, India. It is one of 12 constituencies in Warangal district. It is part of Warangal Lok Sabha constituency.
Parkal Assembly constituency is a constituency of Telangana Legislative Assembly, India. It is one of 12 constituencies in Warangal district. It is part of Warangal Lok Sabha constituency.

Challa Dharma Reddy is representing the constituency.

Parkal is a municipality, earlier it was Nagar Panchayat. Parkal Nagar Panchayat was constituted in 2011 and has 20 election wards. It is also the place where Parkala Massacre of 1947 took place. Parkal is a hub for medical, business and agricultural activities. Place worth to visit in Parkal is Amaradhaamam, a monument build to commemorate martyr's of 1947 massacre.

Transport 
 Railway station is 20 Km away from Parkal, from this station so many passengers travels to their destinations. And It is (PRKL) well connected through road network. Telangana State Road Transport Corporation runs buses from Parkal to various destinations. National Highway 353 passes through parkal.

References 

Mandals in Hanamkonda district